Fingerprints is a 2006 American supernatural slasher film directed by Harry Basil, and starring Leah Pipes, Kristin Cavallari and Josh Henderson.

Plot
Fingerprints is based on an urban legend out of San Antonio, Texas about a school bus full of children that was involved in a terrible accident with a train leaving all the children dead.
The movie centers on a teenage girl, Melanie (Pipes), who has just finished rehab. She moves to her family's new home in the town of Emerald, where her father is a part of the crew constructing a highway over the old train tracks. Her sister, Crystal (Cavallari), tells her of the legend and she begins seeing the ghost of Julie, one of the dead children and becomes more and more involved in mysterious occurrences in the town. Meanwhile, someone in a train conductor's uniform begins to murder the people around Melanie.

Cast
 Leah Pipes as Melanie
 Kristin Cavallari as Crystal
 Michael Mendoza as Shawn
 Josh Henderson as Penn
 Sally Kirkland as Mary
 Andrew Lawrence as Mitch
 Geoffrey Lewis as Keeler
 Lou Diamond Phillips as Doug
 Ashley Watt as Carolyn
 Glen Jensen as Kowalski
 Sydnee Harlan as Julie

Filming
Fingerprints was filmed in April and May 2006 in two Oklahoma towns. Parts of the film center around Emerald High School that Cavallari attends in the fictional town of Emerald, Texas. All of these scenes were filmed inside the historic Harding High Schoolbuilding in Oklahoma City. In addition, scenes were filmed in the Heritage Hills neighborhood of Oklahoma City (another historic area), along with various other sites in Oklahoma City. Parts of the movie were filmed at the Stone Lion Inn in the town of Guthrie, a currently operating bed & breakfast. The scene at the Train Depot was also filmed in Guthrie, OK. The Police Department scene, including the jail cells, were filmed at the Guthrie Police Department.

Awards and nominations
 2006 - New York City Horror Film Festival -

References

External links
 
  
 

2006 films
Films set in Texas
Films shot in Oklahoma
American supernatural horror films
Films based on urban legends
Films directed by Harry Basil
2000s English-language films
2000s American films